Bela nebula, also known as the nebular needle conch is a species of sea snail, a marine gastropod mollusk in the family Mangeliidae. It is the type species of the genus Bela.

Taxonomy
Bela nebula forms probably a complex, to which Bela laevigata also belongs (Ankel 1936, Van Aartsen et al. 1984)

Description
The shell size varies between 5 mm and 14 mm, characteristic of the Bela genus, with three or four initially smooth protoconch whorls, except for the last, which features low, curved axial riblets overrun by a few rows of obsolete spiral elements, which form swollen tubercles at the intersection.  
The shell consists of eight or nine tumid whorls, with deep sutures. The subsutural band is often beaded. The shell shows strong, slighly curved ribs and narrow, spiral ridges and growth lines. The numerous ridges are finely beaded. The subsutural band is slightly swollen. The aperture of the shell is lanceolate and elongated, with a thin outer lip that becomes angular  where it meets the body whorl. There is an anal sinus and a short, wide siphonal canal.

The colour of the shell is variable and goes from white to yellowish brown and orange.

The species breeds in spring and summer, depositing eggs in lenticular capsules.

Distribution
This species occurs on sand and muddy gravel bottoms in European waters off Belgium and the British Isles, in the Northeast Atlantic Ocean off Norway, in the Atlantic Ocean off Spain, Portugal, the Azores and Madeira and in the Mediterranean Sea

References

 Hayward, P.J.; Ryland, J.S. (Ed.) (1990). The marine fauna of the British Isles and North-West Europe: 1. Introduction and protozoans to arthropods. Clarendon Press: Oxford, UK. . 627 pp
 de Kluijver, M.J.; Ingalsuo, S.S.; de Bruyne, R.H. (2000). Macrobenthos of the North Sea [CD-ROM]: 1. Keys to Mollusca and Brachiopoda. World Biodiversity Database CD-ROM Series. Expert Center for Taxonomic Identification (ETI): Amsterdam, The Netherlands. 
 Gofas, S.; Le Renard, J.; Bouchet, P. (2001). Mollusca, in: Costello, M.J. et al. (Ed.) (2001). European register of marine species: a check-list of the marine species in Europe and a bibliography of guides to their identification. Collection Patrimoines Naturels, 50: pp. 180–213+
 Muller, Y. (2004). Faune et flore du littoral du Nord, du Pas-de-Calais et de la Belgique: inventaire. [Coastal fauna and flora of the Nord, Pas-de-Calais and Belgium: inventory]. Commission Régionale de Biologie Région Nord Pas-de-Calais: France. 307 pp
 Scarponi et al.: Lectotype designation for Murex nebula Montagu 1803 (Mangeliidae) and its implications for Bela Leach in Gray 1847, Zootaxa 2014

External links
 
  Tucker, J.K. 2004 Catalog of recent and fossil turrids (Mollusca: Gastropoda). Zootaxa 682:1-1295.
 MNHN, Paris : Bela nebula

nebula
Gastropods described in 1803